Federal Highway 200 (Carretera Federal 200), also known as Carretera Pacífico, is a Federal Highway of Mexico. The Carretera Pacífico is the main leg of the Pacific Coastal Highway within Mexico and travels along the Pacific Coast from Mexican Federal Highway 15 in Tepic, Nayarit in the north to the Guatemala-Mexico border at Talismán, Chiapas in the south. Upon entering Guatemala, the highway continues as Central American Highway 2 (CA-2).

Major cities along the route

 Tepic, Nayarit
 Puerto Vallarta, Jalisco
 Manzanillo, Colima
 Lázaro Cárdenas, Michoacán
 Zihuatanejo, Guerrero
 Tecpán de Galeana
 Acapulco, Guerrero
 Huatulco, Oaxaca
 Salina Cruz, Oaxaca
 Juchitán de Zaragoza, Oaxaca
 Tapachula, Chiapas
 Tuxtla Chico

References

200
Transportation in Colima
Transportation in Guerrero
Transportation in Michoacán
Nayarit
Transportation in Oaxaca
Transportation in Chiapas